Norman George Denny (1901–1982), also known under the pseudonyms Norman Dale and Bruce Norman, was an English writer and translator.

He was born in Kent, later living for two years in Mexico City where his father was a mining engineer, before returning to England where he lived until his death. He was educated at Radley College, in Paris, and in Vienna.

Denny wrote many short stories and novels under different names, but he is perhaps best remembered for his numerous French to English translations, in particular for Hugo's Les Misérables, though he has been criticized for abridging the text. He also translated works by Marcel Aymé, André Maurois, Charles Perrault, Jean Renoir, Georges Simenon, Teilhard de Chardin, and Michel Tournier. Most of his translations were from French, but he also translated several German books.
He married Gillian Watts in 1936 and they had one son Michael.

References

1901 births
1982 deaths
20th-century British translators
Translators of Victor Hugo
British expatriates in Mexico